Gourlay Steell RSA (1819–1894) was a 19th-century Scottish artist.

Life

Gourlay was born at 20 Calton Hill in Edinburgh on 22 March 1819 the son of John Steell, a wood-carver and Margaret Gourlay of Dundee. His elder brother John was a sculptor of national standing.

He studied under William Allan and Robert Scott Lauder.

Aged only 13 he had his first piece displayed at the Royal Scottish Academy, a model of a greyhound, and in 1835 he displayed a full-size sculpture of a bloodhound. From that year until death he exhibited almost continually.

By the 1840s he had established himself and was living in a fine house at 33 East Claremont Street in Edinburgh's New Town.

In 1872 he was appointed the official painter of animals to Queen Victoria, succeeding Sir Edwin Landseer. In 1882 he replaced Sir William Fettes Douglas as Curator of the National Gallery of Scotland. At this time he was living with his family at 4 Palmerston Place in Edinburgh's West End.

In 1882 he succeeded William Fettes Douglas as Principal Curator of the National Gallery of Scotland, serving until death, and eventually after an inter-regnum being replaced by Robert Gibb.

He died on 31 January 1894 at 23 Minto Street, Edinburgh and was buried in Morningside Cemetery, Edinburgh with his wife Jessie Anderson who had died in 1883. The exceptionally modest gravestone has fallen, and lies forlornly in the westmost section of the cemetery, adjacent to modern housing developments.

His son, David George Steell ARSA followed in his footsteps and became an animal artist.

Works
see
Greyfriars Bobby (1889) purchased by Patrick Dudgeon FRSE
The Shooting Party, Royal Armouries Museum, Leeds
Deerstalking on Jura, Glasgow Museums
A Challenge, Glasgow Museums (two Highland cattle fighting)
The Trysting Place, Glasgow Museums (three dogs)
A Highland Parting, Dundee Art Gallery and Museum (sheep and Highland cattle at a river)
John Hay Esq of Letham Grange, Angus Council
Old Pets of Haddo, National Trust for Scotland (ponies)

References

 Dictionary of National Biography: Steell

External links
http://www.avictorian.com/Steell_Gourlay.html

1819 births
1894 deaths
Scottish artists
Royal Scottish Academicians
artists from Edinburgh
Alumni of the Edinburgh College of Art